A Year in the Life of a Year is a British comedy programme created by and starring Rhys Thomas and co-starring his frequent collaborators, Lucy Montgomery, Tony Way and Simon Day. It is broadcast on BBC Two. The programme is a spoof review of significant national and cultural moments from the year gone by and uses re-edited and dubbed television and film output. Famous parodies included Paddington meets A Very English Scandal.

The programme was first broadcast on 30 December 2016 with the title 2016: A Year in the Life of a Year. A second episode, reviewing 2017, was announced in May 2017. The second show aired on 30 December on BBC Four. A third episode aired on BBC Two on 27 December 2018 and was critically acclaimed. A fourth episode aired on BBC Two on 1 January 2020, reviewing 2019.

References

External links
 
 
 
 

BBC television comedy
2016 British television series debuts
2010s British comedy television series
English-language television shows
British parody television series